Joyce Keller is an American television and radio host, author, and psychic medium. She has hosted a live radio show The Joyce Keller Show since 1989 on New York's WGBB. She has also authored 7 international best-selling books, including the Angel Series books, Seven Steps to Heaven, Calling All Angels, and Complete Book of Numerology.

References

External links
Official website

Living people
American talk radio hosts
American women radio presenters
American spiritual writers
American spiritual mediums
Year of birth missing (living people)